Bassett Racing is an American stock car racing team that competes in the NASCAR Xfinity Series. The team was founded in 2009 by Ronnie Bassett Sr., and currently fields the No. 77 Chevrolet Camaro SS part-time for his sons, Ronnie and Dillon Bassett.

History 
Bassett Racing was formed in 2009 by Ronnie Bassett Sr., to allow his oldest son, Ronnie Bassett Jr., to race in the USRA STARS Late Model Series. Dillon Bassett, his younger son, would debut in 2011, and would later win the championship in 2013.

K&N Pro Series East

Car No. 04 history

Ronnie Bassett Jr. (2013-2018) 
The team made their K&N Pro Series East (now ARCA Menards Series East) debut in 2013, with Ronnie Bassett Jr. driving in three races. He finished 23rd in his first race at Greenville-Pickens Speedway, and would follow up with a 10th place finish at New Hampshire Motor Speedway. The team would run the full schedule in 2014, with Bassett getting three top fives and six top tens, finishing 11th in the final standings. The team went back to a part-time schedule from 2015 to 2016, finishing 15th in point standings for both years. 2017 would be the team's breakout season, as Bassett would collect his first career win at New Smyrna Speedway, after leading 42 laps. He finished off the season with eight top fives and eleven top tens, finishing their career best 3rd in points. He returned for one more full time season in 2018, finishing 4th in points after getting three top fives and nine top tens.

Car No. 04 Results

Car No. 44 history

Dillon Bassett (2015-2018) 
The team would field a second car in 2015, the No. 44 being driven by Dillon Bassett. Bassett started off with a sixth place finish at New Smyrna, and a streak of top 20 finishes for the next few races. Bassett earned his first career win for the team at Motordrome Speedway, after dominating the race and leading 54 laps. He finished 13th in the standings that season. He continued running part time in 2016, before going full time in 2017. He finished his career best 8th in point standings for both 2017 and 2018.

Car No. 44 Results

K&N Pro Series West

Car No. 04 history

Ronnie Bassett Jr. (2015, 2017) 
Bassett Jr. made his K&N Pro Series West (now ARCA Menards Series West) debut for the team in 2015, driving in a collaboration race with K&N East Series. His only start that season would come at Phoenix Raceway, where he finished 10th. His last start would come in 2017, finishing 23rd at the Kern County Raceway Park.

Car No. 04 Results

Car No. 44 history

Dillon Bassett (2017) 
Bassett ran at Kern County Raceway Park in 2017, in a collaboration race with the K&N East Series. He would finish in 5th.

Car No. 44 Results

Xfinity Series

Car No. 77 history
On February 2, 2021, Ronnie Bassett Sr. and his sons announced that they would be reviving their team, and would attempt to run the full 2021 NASCAR Xfinity Series season with Ronnie and Dillon Bassett. The team failed to qualify the season-opener at Daytona due to qualifying being rained out. The team would DNQ for the next 9 races due to combination of the number of entries per race and a lack of qualifying. Bassett Racing would debut at Circuit of the Americas with Austin Dillon being able to qualify on time, he would finish 13th. The team would fail to qualify for the rest of the season once again because of no qualifying. Bassett Racing plans to run 15-18 races in 2022. Dillon Bassett would finally manage to qualify the No. 77 at Nashville after a string of DNQs.

Car No. 77 results

References

External links 

American auto racing teams
NASCAR teams
Auto racing teams established in 2009